Ayvacık railway station a station on the İzmir-Afyon railway situated on the southern bank of the Gediz River. It is owned by the Turkish State Railways which operates several daily trains through the station. Since ridership is low, the station is mainly used as a siding to allow trains to pass one-another.

References

External links
Ayvacik station timetable

Railway stations in İzmir Province
Railway stations opened in 1865
1865 establishments in the Ottoman Empire
Menemen District